Oldřich Hejdušek (born 1 October 1957) is a Czech rowing coxswain. He competed at the 1980 Summer Olympics, 1988 Summer Olympics and the 1992 Summer Olympics.

References

1957 births
Living people
Czech male rowers
Olympic rowers of Czechoslovakia
Rowers at the 1980 Summer Olympics
Rowers at the 1988 Summer Olympics
Rowers at the 1992 Summer Olympics
Sportspeople from Brno
Coxswains (rowing)